Greenly may refer to:

People with the surname
Henry Greenly, the railway engineer, and a contributor to Model Engineer magazine
Mike Greenly, American author, journalist, lyricist
William L. Greenly, American politician

Places
Greenly Island (South Australia), an island in Australia
Greenly Island Conservation Park, includes the above island
Greenly Island, Canada, an island in Quebec, Canada
Lake Greenly, a lake in Australia
Mount Greenly (South Australia), a mountain in Australia

See also
Greenlee County, Arizona